Ferrier is a surname of European origin.

People named Ferrier
Notable people with this family name include:

 Arnaud du Ferrièr (c.1508–1585), French lawyer and diplomat
 David Ferrier (1843–1924), Scottish medical scientist
 James Ferrier (1800–1888), merchant and politician
 James Frederick Ferrier (1808–1864), Scottish metaphysical writer
 Jim Ferrier (1915–1986), Australian golfer
 Johan Ferrier (1910–2010), Surinamese politician (first President)
 John Ferrier (c.1759–1836), Royal Navy officer
 John Todd Ferrier (1855–1943), former Congregational pastor in Macclesfield, England, left the church in 1903 to found the Order of the Cross, advocating vegetarianism from a Christian viewpoint
 Kathleen Ferrier (1912–1953), English contralto
 Kathleen Ferrier (politician) (born 1957), Dutch politician (daughter of Johan)
 Margaret Ferrier (born 1960), Scottish Member of Parliament
 Paul Ferrier (1843–1928), French dramatist
 Scott Ferrier (born 1974), Australian decathlete
 Susan Edmonstone Ferrier (1782–1854), Scottish novelist
 Walter Frederick Ferrier (1865–1950), Canadian geologist

English-language surnames